The HTC U11 is an Android smartphone manufactured and sold by HTC as part of the HTC U series. It was announced on 16 May 2017 and succeeds the HTC 10 smartphone. In the United States, the HTC U11's major carrier is Sprint; however, it is also compatible with unlocked carriers, such as AT&T, T-Mobile, and Verizon.

On May 23, 2018, HTC presented its successor, the HTC U12+.

Specifications

Hardware 
The HTC U11 has a glass unibody-like design with an aluminium frame that includes pressure sensitive points for the implementation of HTC Edge Sense. This enables users to control or navigate several functions by pressing the edges of the metal frame. It is fitted with a 5.5-inch Super LCD 5 Quad HD (2560×1440 pixels) display. The front glass is made of Corning Gorilla Glass 5 while the rear glass uses Gorilla Glass 3. HTC U11 features a 3000 mAh battery with Quick Charge 3.0.

The rear camera is a 12 megapixels sensor with 1.4μm pixels and an f/1.7 aperture; it also includes OIS and Ultraspeed Autofocus. The front camera is a 16megapixels sensor with an f/2.0 aperture and includes EIS.

The HTC U11 has 4 microphones for 24-bit 360-degree audio recording. It also has HTC BoomSound Hi-Fi edition stereo speakers where the headphone acts as the tweeter while the bottom firing speaker acts as the woofer. Dust and water resistance are included with an IP67 certification.

The phone ships with the Qualcomm Snapdragon 835 chipset and includes either 4 GB RAM and 64 GB of storage or 6GB RAM and 128GB of storage.

Software 
The HTC U11 ships with Android 7.1 Nougat with an overlay of HTC Sense UI. HTC is also currently rolling out Android 8.0 Oreo (without the Treble feature for device independent system updates) updates for the phone via OTA. Google Assistant, Amazon Alexa and Baidu Duer (China only) are pre-installed. Alexa only became available on 17 July 2017. HTC Sense Companion is installed to make personalized suggestions by learning from daily routines and suggestions based on the user's location.

Sales 
On 15 June 15 2017, Chang Chia-lin, the president of HTC's smartphone and connected device division, stated that the HTC U11 had been selling better than its predecessors, the HTC One M9 and the HTC 10.

HTC U11+ 

HTC unveiled an upgraded version of the U11, the U11+, on November 2, 2017. It features a 6-inch 2:1 display (marketed as 18:9) with thinner bezels, a larger battery, a rear-mounted fingerprint reader, IP68 certification for dust and water resistance, and is pre-loaded with Android 8.0 Oreo. The Verge reported via internal sources that the U11+ had previously been developed as a successor to the original Pixel XL smartphone HTC had developed with Google, under the codename "Muskie", but that it had been shelved in favor of a version produced by LG instead, and was re-engineered into an update to the U11.

HTC U11 Life 
The U11 Life is a T-Mobile exclusive smartphone that was unveiled by HTC along with the U11+ on the same day. It features a 5.2-inch display, IP67 certification for water and dust resistance, a 73 hour long battery life, and is also shipped with Android 8.0 Oreo. Unlike the U11+, the U11 Life has a smaller display and comes shipped with the 4th Generation Android One platform, which it joined on September 13, 2017.
It is based on SoC Qualcomm Snapdragon 630 with 3 or 4 GB RAM.

References 

U11
Android (operating system) devices
Mobile phones introduced in 2017
Mobile phones with 4K video recording
Discontinued smartphones